Kiss Fresh is a British digital radio station owned and operated by Bauer as part of the Kiss Network, and a sister station to Kiss.

As of June 2022, the station has a weekly audience of 301,000 listeners, according to RAJAR.

History 
Initially provided over Freeview (replacing Smash Hits Radio) and online, the station was made available via digital radio in the London area, alongside sister station Kisstory, from 12 December 2014.

The DAB availability of Kiss Fresh extended beyond London from 1 May 2016, with the station being made available in some (but not all) of the areas previously served by Kisstory on local DAB, this capacity having been released following the migration of Kisstory to Sound Digital.

National DAB expansion 
From 10 July 2017, Kiss Fresh itself expanded to national DAB availability, joining the lineup of services on Digital One alongside the parent Kiss FM UK service; as part of the move the Kiss Fresh schedule and playlist was revised to better differentiate Kiss Fresh from its sibling. On 6 November 2017 it was removed from Digital One and replaced by Magic Christmas, and subsequently Absolute Radio 90s used the slot during 2018: a reshuffle of DAB capacity in February 2019 ahead of the launch of Scala Radio put Kisstory in this slot on D1.

Most DAB carriage of Kiss Fresh ended at the end of March 2019 when the local-tier DAB slots were largely turned over to the new Country Hits Radio. (In Northern Ireland, where Bauer already operated Downtown Country, the Kiss Fresh slot went to Greatest Hits Radio). Kiss Fresh continues to broadcast nationally via Freeview and online.

References

External links
 

Bauer Radio
Radio stations in London
Radio stations established in 2013
2013 establishments in England
Kiss Network